Hulk Hogan's Rock 'n' Wrestling is an American animated television series that originally aired on CBS Saturday mornings from September 14, 1985 to October 18, 1986, with reruns airing until June 27, 1987.

History
Hulk Hogan's Rock 'n' Wrestling was animated and produced by DIC Animation City. It featured animated adventures of popular WWF stars from the time, including its title character Hulk Hogan and his group of face wrestlers fighting against a group of rogue heel wrestlers led by "Rowdy" Roddy Piper. The show followed cartoon archetypes concerning good characters triumphing over evildoers in wacky situations, typical of children's cartoons in the 1980s.

Rarely referenced, wrestling was simply a device to determine the good guys from the bad guys. The wrestlers themselves appeared in the live action segments of the show, but due to their busy travel schedules, they did not provide the voices for their animated counterparts. These were instead performed by professional voice actors. One recurring live action segment was the music video for the cover of "Land of a Thousand Dances" recorded by several WWF wrestlers for The Wrestling Album.

Due to the show being animated and the longer production times that resulted, it often failed to keep pace with the events of the WWF at the time. This resulted in certain wrestlers turning heel (or, in non-wrestling terms, a villain) in regular WWF programming, but remaining good guys on the cartoon and vice versa; examples include "Rowdy" Roddy Piper (who was a heel when the show debuted, but became a face in the fall of 1986, despite remaining a bad guy in the cartoon) and André the Giant (who was a face in the fall of 1985, but turned heel in early 1987, despite remaining on the good guys' side throughout the series' run). Additionally, the characters of Jimmy "Superfly" Snuka and Wendi Richter remained throughout the series' run, despite both having left the WWF in late 1985.

WWE currently own the rights to the program.

In April 2015, WWE added the show to the WWE Network, making its premiere following the April 20 episode of WWE Raw. On July 24, Hulk Hogan was fired by the WWE and all references to Hulk Hogan, including Hulk Hogan's Rock 'n' Wrestling, were removed from the WWE Network.

Characters
Hulk Hogan was the leader of the faces, or good guys, heroes, or protagonists; consisting of Junkyard Dog, Captain Lou Albano, André the Giant, Wendi Richter, Jimmy "Superfly" Snuka, Hillbilly Jim, and Tito Santana. "Rowdy" Roddy Piper was the leader of the heels, or bad guys, villains, or antagonists; consisting of The Iron Sheik, Nikolai Volkoff, The Fabulous Moolah, Big John Studd, and Mr. Fuji. Bobby "The Brain" Heenan and "Mean" Gene Okerlund appeared animated in a few episodes as well.

Music
The opening theme to Hulk Hogan's Rock 'n' Wrestling is "Hulk Hogan's Theme", composed by Jim Steinman. It was also used as Hogan's ring entrance theme, before being replaced with "Real American" by Rick Derringer. Steinman later reworked "Hulk Hogan's Theme" into "Ravishing", performed by Bonnie Tyler and featured on her 1986 album Secret Dreams and Forbidden Fire.

List of episodes
Hulk Hogan's Rock 'n' Wrestling aired for two seasons beginning in 1985.  Each episode was 30 minutes in length (including commercial breaks). Some episodes contained one 30 minute cartoon, while other episodes contained two 15 minute cartoons. Over the two seasons, there were a total of 26 episodes with 39 cartoons.

Season 1 (1985)

Season 2 (1986)

Voices
 Brad Garrett - Hulk Hogan
 Charlie Adler - "Rowdy" Roddy Piper
 Lewis Arquette - Jimmy "Superfly" Snuka
 James Avery - Junkyard Dog
 Jodi Carlisle - Wendi Richter, The Fabulous Moolah
 George DiCenzo - Captain Lou Albano
 Ron Feinberg - André the Giant
 Pat Fraley - Hillbilly Jim
 Ron Gans - Nikolai Volkoff
 Ernest Harada - Mr. Fuji
 Aron Kincaid - The Iron Sheik
 Chuck Licini - Big John Studd
 Joey Pento - Tito Santana
 Neil Ross - "Mean" Gene Okerlund

See also
 Rock 'n' Wrestling Connection

References

Further reading

External links
 
 
 Hulk Hogan's Rock 'n' Wrestling photo gallery at WWE.com
  profiles on every WWE Employee to be featured on the show
 Hulk Hogan website

1980s American animated television series
1985 American television series debuts
1986 American television series endings
American children's animated action television series
American children's animated adventure television series
American children's animated comedy television series
American children's animated sports television series
American television series with live action and animation
Animation based on real people
CBS original programming
Television series by DIC Entertainment
Animated television series by WWE
Cultural depictions of Hulk Hogan